The Illinois Mr. Basketball award is given to the person chosen as the best high school boys basketball player in the U.S. state of Illinois.

Most of the award winners have gone on to play at the highest levels of college basketball, and many have gone on to play in the National Basketball Association. On April 5, 2010, Jon Scheyer became the second winner to also have played on both a high school state championship and a Division 1 NCAA championship team, along with Brian Sloan. In 2012 Jabari Parker became the first non-senior to win the award, and in 2013 he became the first to win the award twice. In 2017 Mark Smith became the 12th winner to enroll at the University of Illinois.

Voting is done on a points system. Each voter selects first, second, and third-place votes. A player receives five points for each first-place vote, three points for each second-place vote, and one point for a third-place vote. The player who receives the most points receives the award.

Award recipients

Awards by high school

* - Indicates a tie in which the award was shared

See also
Illinois Miss Basketball

References

Mr. and Miss Basketball awards
Awards established in 1981
Lists of people from Illinois
Mr. Basketball